Lymantria  grisea is a species of moth of the family Erebidae.

Distribution
It is found in Nepal, northern India and Thailand, Myanmar, China and Taiwan.

The length of the forewings of this species is 21–25 mm for the females and 17–19 mm for the males.

References
Moore, 1879, in Hewitson & Moore, Descr. new Indian lepid. Insects Colln. late Mr. Atkinson: 55, pl.3, fig. 5.

External links
boldsystems.org: images of this species

Lymantria
Moths of Asia
Moths described in 1879